Out of Eden was an American gospel music group often identified with R&B and contemporary Christian music. It featured sisters Lisa Kimmey, Andrea Kimmey-Baca, and Danielle Kimmey. The group was active from 1994 to 2006, producing seven albums through Gotee Records and receiving "Urban Album of the Year" and "Urban Song of the Year" at the Dove Awards of 2003.

Musical career

Origins
The band consisted of three sisters Lisa Kimmey, Andrea Kimmey-Baca, and Danielle Kimmey, all born in Richmond, Virginia between 1975 and 1982 to Robert Kimmey and DeLise Perkins Kimmey Hall. When the girls were young, their parents divorced and they moved with their mother to Nashville, where DeLise was offered a teaching position at Fisk University. Danielle and her sisters initially sang back-up for their mother, who was a classical pianist. After their stepfather unsuccessfully attempted to garner attention for the girls by sending a video of their singing to various record labels, Danielle and her sisters were discovered by Toby McKeehan, who formed the record label Gotee Records to produce their music.

In 1994, they released their debut Lovin' the Day. The first single off the album was a remake of the Bill Withers 1978 single "Lovely Day" and was a Christian Contemporary Music hit. Their second album, in 1996, More Than You Know, was even more successful and catapulted the sisters into the CCM spotlight.

Mainstream Success
Their third album, the acclaimed No Turning Back, was released in 1999. Released in 2002, their fourth and best-selling Gotee album, This Is Your Life, entered the Billboard 200, peaking at No. 178. The album tied for "Urban Album of the Year" at the Dove Awards of 2003, with a song from the album, "Meditate" going on to win the award "Urban Recorded Song of the Year". The album was also nominated for a Stellar Award.

Another two years went by before the up-tempo album Love, Peace & Happiness was released. This album was nominated for Dove Awards in the Urban Gospel Album of the Year category and Urban Gospel Song of the Year category for the song "Soldiers".

In early 2005, Out of Eden presented an a cappella version of an old hymn at a "Focus on the Family" chapel service, receiving a standing ovation. Struck by the response to the hymn and the power of the lyrics, they decided to explore a new side of their musical talents and released a CD of remakes of classic hymns titled Hymns. The album was nominated for a 2006 Grammy award in the Best Pop/Contemporary Gospel Album category.

In June 2006, the group announced that they would disband after the release of their greatest hits album titled The Hits.

Awards

Discography

Studio albums

Compilations

References

External links
 [ Allmusic entry]

American contemporary R&B musical groups
Grammy Award winners
American hip hop singers
American gospel musical groups
Musical groups established in 1994
Gotee Records artists
African-American musical groups
Musical groups from Virginia
Sibling musical trios
American girl groups
Family musical groups
American pop music groups